Night writing is the name given to a form of writing invented by Charles Barbier as one of a dozen forms of alternative writing presented in a book published in 1815: Essai sur Divers Procédés D'Expéditive Française, Contenant douze écritures différentes, avec une Planche pour chaque procédé (Essay on Various Processes of French Expedition, Containing twelve different writings, with a Plate for each process). The term (in French: écriture nocturne) does not appear in the book, but was later applied to the method shown on Plate VII of that book. This method of writing with raised dots that could be read by touch was adopted at the Institution Royale des Jeune Aveugles (Royal Institution for Blind Youth) in Paris. 

Barbier also invented the tools for creating writing with raised dots. A student at the school, Louis Braille, used the tools and Barbier's idea of communicating with raised dots in a form of code, and developed a more compact and flexible system for communications.

See also

 Nyctography

References

Tactile alphabets
1808 introductions
Writing systems introduced in the 19th century